The Church in the name of the Prophet of God Elijah (Zharkent city) is an Eastern Orthodox Church in the name of the Prophet of God Elijah. This an architectural monument built in 1892 year. The Church has same style as the Vernensky Cathedral.

Specification 
The temple building constructed from Tian Shan spruce. The building stands on a brick and lime foundation. The temple building is a chopped building with richly decorated carvings. The building has a cruciform and five- domed shape. The width of the Church from North to South is 6,114 fathoms, from West to East-11.83 fathoms. The altar of the temple has parameters: length-2 fathoms, height-2 fathoms, width-2.83 fathoms. The capacity of the temple is 750 people. The Church has a belfry of six bells. The crosses of the Church covered with scarlet iron and bronze. 
The Church building designed by the architect Troparevsky. The military Governor Chanov and the right Reverend Arkady approved the project.

Shrines of the temple 
The following shrines are stored and displayed in the temple:
1. The fragments of the relics of the Holy Martyr Basil (Kalmykov), the priest of Jarkent and others of the slain Jarkent new martyrs, whose relics were found on April 26, 2002 at the cemetery of the village of Podgornenskaya (now- the village of Kyrgyzay)
2. The icon with the image of all 15 martyrs (14 have not yet been canonized, data is being collected)
3. The part of the relics of Saint Innocent, Bishop of Irkutsk
4. The fragments of the relics of the venerable martyrs Seraphim and Theognost of the Almaty city
5. The part of the relics of the priest Nicholas (Mogilev)
6. The particles of relics of Optina elders
7. The honor an ancient image of the Mother of God called "Joy of All who sorrow» 
8. The icon of Saint Nicholas, Archbishop of Myra of Lycia, Wonderworker, which belonged to the headman of the Church of the village of Podgorny, Martyr Zosima (Funtikov) and was given on the day of the finding of the Holy relics by his granddaughter Vera Ignatievna Starikova.
The parish of the Church has a library and Sunday school.

History 
In 1882, the clergyman Pavel Beloyarov headed the Church of St. Nicholas. On August 12, 1882, he opened the question of building a temple. The construction of the temple carried out for more than 5 years. The construction of the temple carried out thanks to charitable donations. The Turkestan Bishop and Tashkent Arkady (Kaprinsky) consecrated Saint Antimins (a rectangular cloth plate with an embroidered icon) on October 16, 1898. Saint Antimins given to the Church on December 5, 1900. On December 22, 1900, priests Mikhail Uspensky, Viktor Illarionov and Alexander Komarovsky consecrated the Church. 
Under the USSR, the Church building closed and used as a grain warehouse, sports hall, school and club. Improper use of the temple led to the dilapidation of the building. 
From 1991 to 1994, the Church reconstructed. The Church started functioning in 1991.
Since May 17, 1992, the rector of the Church is the priest Pavel Ivanov-now Abbot Vianor. 
On the territory of the Church is located "Jordan", which was built and consecrated on July 23, 2010.
Due to the architectural design, the strongest earthquake of 11-12 points did not damage the building in 1910.

Source and links 
1. Город Верный — нынешний Алматы.
2. Жаркент — восточные ворота. www.voxpopuli.kz. Дата обращения 28 августа 2019.
3. Храм Пророка Илии

Eastern Orthodox church buildings in Kazakhstan